The 37th Assembly District of Wisconsin is one of 99 districts in the Wisconsin State Assembly. Located in south-central Wisconsin, the district comprises southern Dodge County and parts of northern Jefferson County, northeast  Dane County, and southeast Columbia County.  It contains the cities of Columbus and Watertown, as well as the villages of Clyman, DeForest, Lowell, and Reeseville, and a significant portion of the village of Windsor.  The district is represented by Republican William Penterman, since July 2021.

The 37th Assembly district is located within Wisconsin's 13th Senate district, along with the 38th and 39th Assembly districts.

List of past representatives

References 

Wisconsin State Assembly districts
Columbia County, Wisconsin
Dane County, Wisconsin
Dodge County, Wisconsin
Jefferson County, Wisconsin